Nicolas Prodhomme (born 1 February 1997) is a French cyclist, who currently rides for UCI WorldTeam .

Major results

2018
 4th Road race, National Under-23 Road Championships
 4th Overall Kreiz Breizh Elites
 4th Il Piccolo Lombardia
 7th Chrono des Nations U23
 8th Paris–Roubaix Espoirs
2019
 1st  Overall Orlen Nations Grand Prix
 4th Giro del Belvedere
 6th Overall Le Tour de Savoie Mont Blanc
 7th G.P. Palio del Recioto
 9th Overall Giro della Regione Friuli Venezia Giulia
1st Stage 1 (TTT)
 9th Overall Grand Prix Priessnitz spa
 10th Overall Circuit des Ardennes

Grand Tour general classification results timeline

References

External links

1997 births
Living people
French male cyclists
Sportspeople from Orne
Cyclists from Normandy